Once Upon a Time... Man is a French animated TV series from 1978 directed by Albert Barillé. It is the first in the Once Upon a Time... franchise. The series explains world history in a format designed for children. The action focuses around one group. The same familiar characters appear in all episodes as they deal with the problems of their time.

Once Upon a Time... Man was purchased by most public broadcasting channels in Europe (and in many other countries) and is well-known by a significant percentage of the population. The program is known for explaining events to children from different viewpoints as the main characters come from many civilizations. The animation was done by a Japanese anime studio, Tatsunoko Productions.

The series' opening and ending title sequences famously used Johann Sebastian Bach's Toccata and Fugue in D minor as the main title theme music. Shortening the piece to only 2 minutes in length, the introduction uses the very beginning, which jumps into the start of the middle section and finally the dramatic ending to coincide with the destruction of Earth at the end of the intro.

The show aired in the United States on the History Channel starting in January 1996.

Regional releases
A DVD boxed set of all the episodes of the series was produced by the French production company Procidis, and distributed locally by various distributors. The DVD series was produced in French, English (not sold in the UK or US), Finnish, German, Dutch, Hebrew, Norwegian, Spanish, Swedish and Polish. In 2011, an English-language, Region 1 DVD box set was made available in Canada and the United States. The set was produced and distributed by Imavision.

Characters
The episodes of Once Upon a Time… Man typically would follow one family, which most typically used the same set of archetypes that would be reused for the scenario. These same characters would later be used in the later additions to the Once Upon a Time... series, with some changes.

Maestro (Roger Carel) – The wise old man. He usually serves as the head of the tribe, as a religious priest, as an advisor to the king, or as an inventor. Maestro's hair is white and so long that it completely covers his body, and only his facial features, arms, and feet are ever visible; he is also distinguished by two hairs on the top of his head that look like antennae. Maestro often keeps objects in his beard and is sometimes seen fiddling around in it to find the one he wishes to present. He also serves as a mentor to the children of the series.
Peter / Pierre Carel (Roger Carel) – Another protagonist of the series, with brown hair, presented as an ordinary but likeable man. He is always married to Pierrette and is good friends with Jumbo. He is sometimes referred to as Pierrot. In some of the episodes set in the medieval era, Peter has blonde hair and is named Bert, but his personality and relationships are the same.
Jumbo / Le Gros (Yves Barsacq) – The strong young man with red curly hair, Jumbo is tall, somewhat clumsy, and very muscular. He prefers to solve problems with his fists, and his best friend Peter often needs to indicate for him not to attack.
Pierrette (Annie Balestra) – A kind blonde woman, typically married to Peter.
The Pest / Le Teigneux (Claude Bertrand) – A strong bully and one of two common recurring villains in the series (the other being the Dwarf). He is the major rival opposing Peter and Jumbo, and is either working against them or arguing with them.
The Dwarf / Le Nabot (Patrick Préjean) – The mastermind behind the Pest, the Dwarf is short and has red hair with three spikes pointing upward. He is often the only one who supports the Pest in his actions, and is often shown as a swindler.
The Clock – A rectangular box with eyes and hands, typically coloured red, the Clock most commonly simply shows the year that the events on-screen are occurring. Occasionally, the Clock does intervene in the series in a minor role, typically to either have some emotional response like surprise or sadness to an event on-screen, or else to correct Maestro in-series when he has ideas too advanced for his historical time period.

Although historical figures would typically appear as themselves, occasionally one of the archetypes would be used, like Maestro as Leonardo da Vinci.

Episodes

See also
 List of French animated television series
 Histeria!

References

External links
 

 Procidis, the series' producer
 
 Hello Maestro at YouTube

Historical television series
Once Upon a Time...
Tatsunoko Production
French children's animated adventure television series
French children's animated drama television series
French children's animated education television series
1978 French television series debuts
1981 French television series endings
1970s French animated television series
1980s French animated television series
Television series set in prehistory
Television series set in ancient history
Television series set in the Middle Ages
Television series set in the Renaissance
Television set in Tudor England
Television series set in the French Revolution
Television series set in the 6th century
Television series set in the 7th century
Television series set in the 8th century
Television series set in the 18th century
Television series set in the 19th century
Television series set in the 20th century
Television series set in the 21st century
Television series set in the 22nd century